Alberto Buela Lamas (born 1946) is an Argentine philosopher. Buela is professor at the National Technological University and the University of Barcelona and works as a researcher in the University of Barcelona. He is best known for his philosophical works on metapolitics, Aristotle and Peronism.

Work 
Alberto Buela was highly influenced by Latin American philosophers such as Gilberto Freyre, Saúl Taborda, and Julio Ycaza Tigerino. He also has listed as an influence the phenomenological work of Max Scheler, the existentialism of Martin Heidegger, Hegel, Aristotle (his main influence), and Carl Schmitt's practical theories.

His work has been based on phenomenology as a method and using the concepts exposed by Heidegger in his works.

Buela is an author of numerous books and articles about metapolitics, ontology, political philosophy, among other topics.

Other media 
Buela appeared as a special guest in a program by TLV1- Toda la verdad primero (a web series about conspiracy theories hosted by Juan Manuel Soaje Pinto) to debate history and politics.

Bibliography

Books 
 El sentido de América, Buenos Aires, Ed. Theoria, 1990
 Reto comunitario, Buenos Aires, 1995

Editor 
 Honneth, Axel: El comunitarismo un debate sobre los fundamentos morales de las sociedades modernas, Ed.Campus Verlag, Frankfort, 1993
 Lipovetsky, Gilles: El crepúsculo del deber, Barcelona, Editorial Anagrama, 1994
 MacIntyre, Alasdair: Tras la virtud, Barcelona, Ed. Crítica, 1987
 Taylor, Charles: Ética de la autenticidad (English title: The Malaise of Modernity), Madrid-Bs. As., Ed. Paidós, 1994
 Walzer, Michael: Spheres of Justice, Oxford, Ed. Blackwell, 1983

References

External links 
 http://www.ensayistas.org/antologia/XXA/buela/
 http://www.ub.edu/stageira/?q=en/members/alberto-buela-lamas-0/
 http://disenso.info/

20th-century Argentine philosophers
21st-century Argentine philosophers
1946 births
Living people
Heidegger scholars